Rockledge is a historic home located at Hagerstown, Washington County, Maryland, United States. It is a two-story limestone farmhouse located on a hill overlooking Little Antietam Creek. It was built in three stages, beginning in the early 19th century.  Also on the property is a small brick smokehouse with a pyramidal roof, a stone springhouse.

It was listed on the National Register of Historic Places in 2003.

References

External links
, including photo from 2002, at Maryland Historical Trust

Houses on the National Register of Historic Places in Maryland
Houses in Hagerstown, Maryland
National Register of Historic Places in Washington County, Maryland